John Downer (born 1951) is an American sign painter, typeface and logo designer. Downer began his career as a painter of signs. Among his best-known digital fonts are Iowan Old Style, Roxy, Triplex Italic, and Brothers.

Downer studied at Washington State University and the University of Iowa. His work was featured amongst that of others in the 2014 documentary Sign Painters. He has lectured on type and sign design at conferences and at The Cooper Union.

Typeface designs
 Iowan Old Style - Venetian old-style serif
 Roxy (Font Bureau) - stroke-modulated sans-serif
 Triplex Italic (Emigre)
 Brothers (Emigre) - chamfered display wedge-serif influenced by nineteenth-century lettering
 Paperback (House Industries) - text serif face with optical sizes
 SamSans - humanist sans-serif
 Vendetta (Emigre) - inspired by old-style Venetian serif fonts but with sharpened serifs
 Council (Emigre) - condensed display wedge-serif, capitals-only
 Ironmonger (Font Bureau) - angular all-caps display alphabet inspired by lettering on buildings 
 Simona (Design Lab) - serif, similar to the work of Fournier and Bodoni

Proprietary typefaces
 Gonnick [for cartoonist Larry Gonnick]
 Screenmax (bitmap serif typefaces at 7 pixel x-height in Roman, Italic, Bold and Black)

References

External links
 Schriftdesigner John Downer - Klingspor Museum article on John Downer's work (German)
 John Downer Speedballs (Typographica)
 Sostav (Russian) - page on Downer's lettering and influences
 Type design in Iowa - Luc Devroye's page on Downer and other Iowa-based type designers
 MyFonts
 John Downer: Paper signs
 John Downer, TYPO Berlin (German)
 Font Bureau profile page

Living people
American typographers and type designers
American graphic designers
1951 births
University of Iowa alumni
Washington State University alumni
Artists from Tacoma, Washington
People from Iowa City, Iowa